Woman Suffrage Association may refer to:

 National American Woman Suffrage Association (NAWSA), formed in 1890
 National Woman Suffrage Association (NWSA), formed in 1869
 American Woman Suffrage Association (AWSA), formed in 1869

 Connecticut Woman Suffrage Association (CWSA), founded in 1869
 Georgia Woman Suffrage Association, founded in 1890
 Maryland Woman Suffrage Association (MWSA), founded in 1889
 Massachusetts Woman Suffrage Association (MWSA), founded in 1870
 Minnesota Woman Suffrage Association (MWSA), founded in 1881
 New England Woman Suffrage Association (NEWSA), founded in 1868
 Texas Woman Suffrage Association (TWSA), founded in 1903

 Canadian Woman Suffrage Association, founded in 1883